Yeonsan-myeon is a part of Nonsan, South Korea.  It is a small township (-myeon), located on the rail line between Nonsan proper and Daejeon. It holds an annual jujube festival, and Hanmin University is located in Yeonsan.

References
 김용경, 2010, "내 고향의 새모습을 상상하며," 논산문하 / Nonsan Culture Quarterly Magazine 117: 9-10.

Nonsan
Towns and townships in South Chungcheong Province